Niverville may refer to the following communities:

Niverville, Manitoba, in Canada
Niverville, New York, in the United States
Niverville (B&A station), a defunct railway station

See also
  (1715-1804), Canadian fur trader and explorer
Louis-Charles Boucher de Niverville (1825-1869), Quebec lawyer and political figure